Karipey Rural District is a rural district (dehestan) in Lalehabad District, Babol County, Mazandaran Province, Iran. At the 2006 census, its population was 31,761, in 8,094 families. The rural district has 56 villages.

References 

Rural Districts of Mazandaran Province
Babol County